Iraq al-Manshiyya was a Palestinian Arab village located 32 km northeast of Gaza City. The village contained two mosques and a shrine for Shaykh Ahmad al-Arayni. It was depopulated after the 1948 Arab-Israeli War.

Location
The village was located 32 km north-east of Gaza, in an area of rolling hills, where the coastal plain and the foothills of the Hebron mountains merged. It was on the south side of the highway between al-Faluja to the north-west, and Bayt Jibrin to the east.

It was also located at the foot of Tell Maqam Shaykh Ahmad al-Arayni, known in Hebrew as Tel Erani. It has been speculated that the mound was of Assyrian origin.

History
Remains from the  Early Bronze Age and  Iron Age have been excavated at Tel Erani, and a Byzantine era burial site has been found south-west of the tell.

A khan was established in 717 H. (1317-1318 C.E.) by al-Malik Jukandar during the reign of the Mamluk sultan al-Nasir Muhammad ibn Qalawun. This is according to inscriptions on either side of the entrance to the Maqam (shrine) Shaykh Ahmad al-Arayni, at the summit of the tell. However, both Mayer and Sharon  thought that the inscription text was not  in situ, with Sharon suggesting that it originally came from a khan, As-Sukkariya, located 5 km south of the Maqam.

Ottoman Empire
Iraq al-Manshiyya, like the rest of Palestine, was incorporated into the Ottoman Empire in 1517, and in the census of   1596 it  appeared under the name Iraq Hatim, located in the nahiya (subdistrict) of Gaza, part of Gaza Sanjak. It had a population of 11 Muslim households; an estimated  61 persons.  They  paid a fixed tax rate of 25% on a number of crops, including wheat, and barley,  as well as goats and beehives; a total of 1,200 akçe.

In 1838, Edward Robinson noted the village, located SW of Summil, part of the  Gaza district.

In 1863,  Victor Guérin visited the village, and described a  white domed   waly on the top of the tell, north of the village. The village itself had around 300 inhabitants, but Guérin assumed it had formerly been larger. Around  two wells were columns of gray-white marble. An Ottoman village list from about 1870 counted 114 houses and a population of 303, though  the population count included men only.

In the late Ottoman Period, a railway station was established near the village, however, this station was destroyed in World War I.

In 1883, the PEF's Survey of Western Palestine described it as a village built of adobe bricks and surrounded by arable land. The village had a radial plan, with its smaller streets branching out from the intersection of two perpendicular main streets. Three wells supplied the village with water for domestic use.  As the village grew, it expanded towards the northeast in the direction of the large mound, called Tall al-Shaykh Ahmad al- Urayni. At the summit, some 32 m. high, was the religious shrine for Shaykh Ahmad al-´Urayni. The shrine consisted of a roofless walled enclosure made of reused stone blocks. The doorway was located in the middle of the north wall. Above the doorway was a marble lintel,  while on each side of the door were the above-mentioned inscriptions. Opposite, on the south wall, was a deep concave mihrab.

British Mandate

The  villagers worked primarily in agriculture; grain, grapes, and many varieties of trees (such as olive and almond trees) were cultivated. In the 1922 census of Palestine, conducted by the British Mandate authorities, ‘Eraq el-Manshiya had a population of 1,132 Muslims, increasing in the 1931 census  to 1347, still all Muslims, in  299 houses. The kibbutz Gat was established in 1941 on lands that the Jewish National Fund acquired from the village.

In  the 1945 statistics   the  population of al-Manshiyya was counted with that of Gat; the two villages had a total population of 2,220; 2,010 Muslims and 210 Jews respectively, with a total of 17,901  dunams of land. Of this, Arabs used  53 dunams  for  plantations and irrigable land, 13,449  for cereals, while they had 35  dunams as built-up land. Goats and sheep supplied the materials (hair and yarn) needed for rug weaving. The villagers dyed their rugs in al-Faluja, where they also went for  medical treatment and other services.

Israel

Iraq al-Manshiyya was in the territory allotted to the Arab state under the 1947 UN Partition Plan.

However, it was captured by Israel's Alexandroni Brigade in October 1948 from Egyptian forces in Operation Yoav. The Egyptian Army controlled the area - which included al-Faluja - surrounded by Israeli forces. After Egypt and Israel negotiated an armistice agreement, the Israeli Defense Forces intimidated the inhabitants to flee.

Following the war, the area was incorporated into the State of Israel, after which kibbutz Gat took over additional lands after the expulsion of the villagers. In 1954 Kiryat Gat was established on village land, and in 1956 Sde Moshe was established on village land east of the village site.

According to the Palestinian historian Walid Khalidi, the structures on the village land in 1992 are: "A forest of eucalyptus has been planted on the site, and two signs, each in both Hebrew and English, identify it as "Margolin Peace Forest."  Only traces of the village streets remain, along with scattered cactuses. Part of the surrounding land is cultivated by Israeli farmers."

The shrine stood until at least 1946 when it was inspected by the Antiquities Department. During the 1950s it was described as being in a very ruinous condition, and Petersen, inspecting it in 1994, found no inscriptions or standing structures; an outline on the ground were the only visible remains of the building.

See also
Depopulated Palestinian locations in Israel

References

Bibliography

 (pp.  156, 203,  318)
 
 
 

 
 

 
 (Cited in Petersen, 2001)
  

Nasser, G.A. (1955/1973):    Memoirs of the First Palestine War in Journal of Palestine Studies   no. 2 (Win. 1973): 3-32

External links
Welcome To 'Iraq al-Manshiyya
Iraq al-Manshiyya, Zochrot,
Survey of Western Palestine, Map 20:   IAA, Wikimedia commons 
'Iraq al-Manshiyya from the Khalil Sakakini Cultural Center
The Nakba, Intel, and Kiryat Gat, by Henry Norr, The Electronic Intifada, 23 July 2008
Tracing All That Remains of Iraq al-Manshiyya, video, youtube.com

Arab villages depopulated after the 1948 Arab–Israeli War
District of Gaza